Woman in the Jungle (German: Weib im Dschungel) is a 1931 American drama film directed by Dimitri Buchowetzki and starring Charlotte Ander, Ernst Stahl-Nachbaur and Erich Ponto. It was shot at the Joinville Studios in Paris as the German-language version of The Letter. Such multiple-language versions were common during the early years of sound before dubbing became widespread. Like the original it was based on the 1927 play The Letter by W. Somerset Maugham.

Synopsis
In British Malaya, the wife of an owner rubber plantation takes a lover amongst the colonial elite. When he tires of her and takes up with a Chinese woman instead, she shoots him dead. She now faces an investigation.

Cast
 Charlotte Ander as Leslie Crosbie 
 Ernst Stahl-Nachbaur as Robert Crosbie 
 Erich Ponto as Joyce 
 Robert Thoeren as Geoffrey Hammond 
 Grace Chiang as Li-Ti 
 Yuon Ling Tschang as Ong 
 Philipp Manning as Der Vorsitzende

References

Bibliography
 Waldman, Harry. Missing Reels: Lost Films of American and European Cinema. McFarland, 2000.

External links
 

1931 films
American drama films
1931 drama films
1930s German-language films
Films directed by Dimitri Buchowetzki
Paramount Pictures films
Films shot in France
Films shot at Joinville Studios
American multilingual films
American black-and-white films
UFA GmbH films
1931 multilingual films
1930s American films